Bury the hatchet is an American English colloquialism, referring to a Native American custom.

Bury the Hatchet may also refer to:
Bury the Hatchet (film), a 2010 documentary film on Mardi Gras in New Orleans, Louisiana
Bury the Hatchet (album), a 1999 album by the Irish rock band The Cranberries
 "Bury the Hatchet", a song from the album Kezia by the Canadian band Protest the Hero